Stanley Roberts (born 1970) is a basketball player.

Stanley Roberts may also refer to:

Stanley Roberts (screenwriter) (1916–1982)
Stan Roberts (1927–1990), Canadian politician
Stan Roberts (footballer) (1921–1995), Welsh footballer
Edward Stanley Roberts (1890–1964), English cricket player

See also
 Robert Stanley (disambiguation)